Duke Xi of Lu was the ruler of Lu from 659 BC to 627 BC in Spring and Autumn period. His name is Ji Shen (姬申). Xi, literally means "happy", is his posthumous name. The posthumous name "Xi" means that he was mediocre and behaved cautiously. His father is Duke Zhuang of Lu. After Duke Xi of Lu died in 627BC, His son, Duke Wen of Lu succeeded him.

See also
 Lu (state)
 Zuo Zhuan

References

Monarchs of Lu (state)
627 BC deaths
7th-century BC Chinese monarchs